This is a list of battalions of the Durham Light Infantry, which existed as a regiment of the British Army from 1881 to 1968.

Original composition

When the 68th Regiment of Foot and the 106th Regiment of Foot became the Durham Light Infantry (DLI) in 1881 under the Cardwell-Childers reforms of the British Armed Forces, seven pre-existing militia and volunteer battalions of County Durham were integrated into the structure of the DLI. These latter battalions had existed intermittently for some time, but had been made permanent in reaction to a perceived threat of invasion by France the late 1850s. The militia, in two battalions, were more appealing to the working classes as the equipment was government funded, while the volunteers were organised as "rifle volunteer corps", independent of the British Army, financially self-supporting and composed primarily of the middle class, they underwent a number of reorganisations before reaching the form in which they were incorporated into the county regiment.

In December 1887 the Durham Rifle Volunteer Battalions were renamed as Volunteer Battalions of the Durham Light Infantry retaining their Administrative battalion numbers. The 3rd Corps sub-title was granted in 1867, with the slight change officially registered in 1887.

Reorganisation

The Territorial Force (renamed the Territorial Army in 1920) was formed in 1908, from the volunteer infantry battalions of the county regiments, and other volunteer arms. The militia battalions transferred to the "Reserve" or the "Special Reserve". The 3rd and 4th battalions exchanged numbers that year, and were recast as the 3rd (Reserve) and 4th (Extra Reserve) battalions in a draft finding role. The reason for this apparently pointless exchange of numbers was that in the event of a mobilisation the War Office intended to use the 3rd battalion of a regiment to provide reinforcements for the regular battalions, while if a regiment had a 4th battalion it would be mobilised as a whole unit. The older unit (1st Durham Fusiliers, then the 3rd battalion) wished to remain as a fighting unit, and so exchanged numbers. All volunteer battalions were renumbered to create a single numerical sequence.

First World War

The Durham Light Infantry would send 22 battalions overseas and lose 12006 other ranks during the course of the war. The regiment's territorial components formed duplicate second and third line battalions of progressively lower fitness men. Many new battalions, technically of the Regular Army, were formed as part of Secretary of State for War Lord Kitchener's appeal for an initial 100,000 men volunteers in August 1914, referred to as the New Army or Kitchener's Army. The 18th and 20th Service battalions, were referred to as "Pals" because they were predominantly composed of work colleagues, the 19th battalion was originally a Bantam battalion. The Volunteer Training Corps were raised with overage or reserved occupation men early in the war, and were initially self-organised into many small corps, with a wide variety of names, such as the Darlington Civilian Rifle Club, formed on 12 September 1914 which had amembership of 260 by December that year.  Recognition of the corps by the authorities brought regulation and as the war continued the small corps were formed into battalion sized units of the county Volunteer Regiment. In 1918 these were linked to county regiments.

Inter-War

By late 1920, all of the regiment's war-raised battalions had disbanded, with many of their Colours laid up in Durham Cathedral. Territorial Force battalions were reformed in 1921, renamed the Territorial Army later in the year.

Second World War

The regiment's expansion during the Second World War was modest compared to 1914–18. Existing territorial battalions formed duplicates as in WWI (using whole rather than fractional numbers), while National Defence Companies were used to create a new "Home Defence" battalion. Hostilities-only battalions were raised after the evacuation of Dunkirk. In addition to this, 26 battalions of the Home Guard were affiliated to the regiment, wearing its cap badge, and also by 1944 one Heavy Anti Aircraft (HAA) battery, and four rocket batteries (Z Battery). Due to the daytime (or shift working) occupations of these men, the batteries required eight times the manpower of an equivalent regular battery. A number of Light Anti-Aircraft (LAA) troops were formed from the local battalions to defend specific points, such as factories.

Post-Second World War

In the immediate post-war period, the army was significantly reduced with all regiments being reduced to one battalion. The D.L.I. was one of only seven regiments to re-raise its second battalion in the early 1950s. After a long period of suspended animation the Militia battalions were finally disbanded in 1953.

Notes

References

Bibliography

Chappel M 1986 British Battle Insignia (1). 1914-18 Osprey Publishing 
 
 Dunn, Clive, (2015) The Fighting Pioneers: the Story of the 7th Durham ..pLight Infantry, Barnsley: Pen & Sword, . 
 
Hart, P 2010 The 16th Battalion Durham Light Infantry in Italy 1943-1945 Pen & Sword 
 
 
Lewis P J 2010 8th Battalion The Durham Light Infantry 1939-1945 Naval and Military Press 

Order of Service 4th 1956 The Laying Up of the Colours of the 4th (Militia) Battalion The Durham Light Infantry Teesdale Mercury
Order of Service 1st 1968 The Laying Up of the Colours of the 1st Battalion The Durham Light Infantry by the Light Infantry G Bails & Sons
Order of Service 9th 1949 The Laying up of the Colours and the Dedication and Unveiling of the Book of Remembrance and Memorial to all Ranks of the 9th Bn The Durham Light Infantry (T.A.) Gale & Polden
Rissik D 1952 (2010) The D.L.I. at War. The History of the Durham Light Infantry 1939-1945. Naval and Military Press 
Sadler J 2010 Dunkirk to Belsen. The Soldiers Own Dramatic Stories JR Books 
Vane W L 1914 (2010) The Durham Light Infantry. The United Red and White Rose  Naval and Military Press 
Ward, S G P 1962 Faithful. The Story of the Durham Light Infantry Naval and Military Press 
 
 Westlake, Ray (2010) Tracing the Rifle Volunteers, Barnsley: Pen and Sword, .
 
The Long Long Trail. Accessed 28 January 2015

Durham Light Infantry
Military units and formations in County Durham
Durham Light Infantry
Durham Light Infantry
Durham Light Infantry
Battalions